John Hagan may refer to:
John Hagan (sailor) (born 1946), eighth Master Chief Petty Officer of the Navy,
 John Hagan (Ohio politician), former Republican member of the Ohio House of Representatives
John N. Hagan (1873–1952), North Dakota politician
John L. Hagan, American sociologist